Luz del Fuego is a 1982 Brazilian drama film directed by David Neves and featuring Lucélia Santos in the lead role. The film is a liberal and romantic narrative of the controversial Brazilian vedette and activist Dora Vivacqua, better known by her stage name Luz del Fuego.

Plot
Present day Guanabara Bay. Former senator João Gaspar (Walmor Chagas) is on his way to Ilha do Sol, the retreat of Luz del Fuego who was assassinated back in 1967. He tells his nurse about his days with Luz, how they met in the late 1940s and how she became his protégée in the following years.

Cast
Lucélia Santos: Dora Vivacqua
Walmor Chagas: João Gaspar
Joel Barcellos: Canário
Ivan Cândido: Teodoro Dias
Helber Rangel: Indalécio
Marco Soares: Agildo
Ítala Nandi: Isabel Gaspar

Production
Co-produced by Riofilme, Morena Filmes, and Sky Light Cinema, Luz del Fuelgo was shot between May and July 1981 in Ilha dos Lobos, Torres, Rio Grande do Sul.

Reception
Luz del Fuego was the winner of awards Best Actress, Best Actor, Best Photography, and Best Scenography at the 1982 Festival de Gramado.

References

External links

1980s erotic drama films
Biographical films about entertainers
Brazilian biographical drama films
Films set in Rio de Janeiro (city)
Films set in the 1950s
Films shot in Rio Grande do Sul
Brazilian erotic drama films
1982 drama films
1982 films